Brunei participated in the 2009 Asian Indoor Games in Hanoi, Vietnam on 30 October – 8 November 2009.

Medal winners

References

Brunei at the Asian Games
Nations at the 2009 Asian Indoor Games
Asian